Viy  () is a Ukrainian animated cartoon directed by Leonid Zarubin, and Alla Grachyova based on the novel of the same name by Nikolai Gogol, filmed by the Ukranimafilm studio in 1996.

Plot
Kyiv seminarians, theologian Khalyava and rhetorician Tiberiy Gorobets, meet in a tavern where they discuss the mysterious death of their friend Khoma Brutus.

Voice cast 
Bohdan Beniuk 
 Natalya Sumska
 Vasyl Mazur
Ivan Kadubets 
 Yevgeny Shakh

Critical response
According to film critic Stanislav F. Rostotsky (Kommersant), "the twenty-minute Ukrainian cartoon by Leonid Zarubin and Alla Grachyova is quite close to the text".

National Oleksandr Dovzhenko Film Centre writes: "Among other screen adaptations of Gogol, this was the closest to the text. The film's production artists created a beautiful, delicate picture of the baroque Cossack Ukraine and populated it with a whole range of diverse peasants. The color scheme is more restrained, almost dull, which is generally a common thing in 90s animation".

Literature
 Lyudmila Saraskina. Literary classics in the temptation of film adaptations. A century of reincarnations (2022)

References

External links
 

1996 animated films
Ukrainian-language films
Films based on Viy (story)
Folk horror films
Films based on Russian folklore
Films based on Slavic mythology
Films about witchcraft
Ukrainian animated films
Ukrainian animated fantasy films